Group 3 consisted of five of the 50 teams entered into the European zone: Azerbaijan, Finland, Hungary, Norway, and Switzerland. These five teams competed on a home-and-away basis for two of the 15 spots in the final tournament allocated to the European zone, with the group's winner and runner-up claiming those spots.

Standings

Results

Notes

External links 
Group 3 Detailed Results at RSSSF

1
1996–97 in Azerbaijani football
1997–98 in Azerbaijani football
1996 in Finnish football
1997 in Finnish football
1996–97 in Hungarian football
1997–98 in Hungarian football
1996 in Norwegian football
1997 in Norwegian football
1996–97 in Swiss football
1997–98 in Swiss football
1995–96 in Azerbaijani football